In animals, a gland is a group of cells in an animal's body that synthesizes substances (such as hormones) for release into the bloodstream (endocrine gland) or into cavities inside the body or its outer surface (exocrine gland).

Structure

Development

Every gland is formed by an ingrowth from an epithelial surface. This ingrowth may in the beginning possess a tubular structure, but in other instances glands may start as a solid column of cells which subsequently becomes tubulated.

As growth proceeds, the column of cells may split or give off offshoots, in which case a compound gland is formed. In many glands, the number of branches is limited, in others (salivary, pancreas) a very large structure is finally formed by repeated growth and sub-division. As a rule, the branches do not unite with one another, but in one instance, the liver, this does occur when a reticulated compound gland is produced. In compound glands the more typical or secretory epithelium is found forming the terminal portion of each branch, and the uniting portions form ducts and are lined with a less modified type of epithelial cell.

Glands are classified according to their shape.
 If the gland retains its shape as a tube throughout it is termed a tubular gland.
 In the second main variety of gland the secretory portion is enlarged and the lumens variously increased in size. These are termed alveolar or saccular glands.

Types of glands
Glands are divided based on their function into two groups:

Endocrine glands

Endocrine glands secrete substances that circulate through the blood stream. The glands secrete their products through basal lamina into the blood stream. Basal lamina typically can be seen as a layer around the glands to which a million, maybe more, tiny blood vessels are attached. These glands often secrete hormones which play an important role in maintaining homeostasis. The pineal gland, thymus gland, pituitary gland, thyroid gland, and the two adrenal glands are all endocrine glands.

Exocrine glands 

Exocrine glands secrete their products through a duct onto an outer or inner surface of the body, such as the skin or the gastrointestinal tract. Secretion is directly onto the apical surface. The glands in this group can be divided into three groups:
 Apocrine glands – a portion of the secreting cell's body is lost during secretion. 'Apocrine glands' is often used to refer to the apocrine sweat glands, however it is thought that apocrine sweat glands may not be true apocrine glands as they may not use the apocrine method of secretion, e.g. mammary gland, sweat gland of arm pit, pubic region, skin around anus, lips and nipples.
 Holocrine glands – the entire cell disintegrates to secrete its substances, e.g. sebaceous glands: meibomian and zeis glands. 
 Merocrine glands – cells secrete their substances by exocytosis, e.g. mucous and serous glands; also called "eccrine", e.g. major sweat glands of humans, goblet cells, salivary gland, tear gland and intestinal glands.

The type of secretory product of exocrine glands may also be one of three categories:
 Serous glands secrete a watery, often protein-rich, fluid-like product, e.g. sweat glands.
 Mucous glands secrete a viscous product, rich in carbohydrates (such as glycoproteins), e.g. goblet cells.
 Sebaceous glands secrete a lipid product. These glands are also known as oil glands, e.g. Fordyce spots and meibomian glands.

Clinical significance

Adenosis is any disease of a gland. The diseased gland has abnormal formation or development of glandular tissue which is sometimes tumorous.

Additional images

References

External links